John Cortes may refer to:
 John Cortes (Gibraltarian politician)
 John Cortes (Florida politician)